Darvand (also Romanized as Dārvand; also known as Dārvan, Qala Darwand, Sher Kush, and Shīr Kosh) is a village in Beshiva Pataq Rural District, in the Central District of Sarpol-e Zahab County, Kermanshah Province, Iran. At the 2006 census, its population was 164, in 37 families.

References 

Populated places in Sarpol-e Zahab County